Hamish Marshall Scott,  (12 July 1946 - 7 December 2022) was a Scottish historian and academic. He was Professor of International History (2000 to 2006) then Wardlaw Professor of International History (2006 to 2009) at the University of St Andrews. Having studied at the University of Edinburgh and the London School of Economics, he began his career lecturing at the University of Birmingham.

Personal life
Scott was born on 12 July 1946, and educated at George Heriot's School, a private school in Edinburgh, Scotland. In 2005, he married Julia Smith.

Honours
In 2006, Scott was elected a Fellow of the British Academy (FBA), the United Kingdom's national academy for the humanities and social sciences. In 2008, he was elected a Fellow of the Royal Society of Edinburgh (FRSE). He was elected a Member of the Academia Europaea (MAE) in 2009.

Selected works

References

1946 births
Living people
20th-century Scottish historians
21st-century Scottish historians
Alumni of the University of Edinburgh
Alumni of the London School of Economics
Academics of the University of Birmingham
Academics of the University of St Andrews
Fellows of the British Academy
Fellows of the Royal Society of Edinburgh
Members of Academia Europaea